Peking or Beijing is the capital city of the People's Republic of China. 

Peking may also refer to:

 Peking (ship), a 1911 German square-rigged sailing ship launched
 2045 Peking, an asteroid named for the city
 SS City of Peking, an 1874 American iron steamship built
 Peking Plan, a 1939 operation in which three Polish Navy destroyers evacuated to the United Kingdom
 Peking Man, formally Homo erectus pekinensis, an ancient hominin
 Local nickname of the Swedish town Norrköping

See also

 Pekingese
 
 Beijing (disambiguation)
 Beijingese (disambiguation)
 Pekin (disambiguation)
 Pekin duck (disambiguation)